Zar je važno da l' se peva ili pjeva... World Tour is the fifth headlining concert tour by Serbian singer Lepa Brena, in support of her eighteenth studio album, Zar je važno dal se peva ili pjeva (2018). The tour is set to begin on 11 November 2017, in Vienna, Austria, at the Lugner City. The tour was also included some festival concerts.

Background 
On October 24, 2017, Brenna's discography house Grand, of which she and co-owner, announced that Brena is on a world tour Zar je važno da l' se peva ili pjeva? and will be sponsored by NetTV Plus. On October 27, 2017, Brena held a press conference in Sofia, Bulgaria to promote a concert in Sofia on March 23, 2018, and announced her great world tour. She also appeared as a guest in a Big Brother, on Nova television where competitors competed who would better imitate Brena and sing like her.
On January 17, 2018, Brena announced the first concert in Serbia on the occasion of the new world tour.

On March 3, 2018, the North America leg was announced.

On March 5, 2018, Brena announced a big Belgrade concert at the Štark Arena in the "Morning with Jovana and Srdjan" on the Prva Srpska Televizija. The tickets for the concert were released for sale on June 20, 2018. After a sold-out concert scheduled for October 20 at the Štark Arena, due to great interest for the spectacle of the year, the Lepa Brena team decided to make another Arena, the next day, on the October 21, 2018. Tickets for the second concert were immediately released for sale, and

On May 12, 2018, Brena announced 4 new dates for Banja Luka, Budva, Velika Kladuša and Svrljig.

On September 27, 2018, the Australia leg was announced.

After the Australian part of the tour, Brena announced a break because she wants to be in Serbia when her stepson Philip and daughter-in-law Alexandra get a baby.

On March 17, 2020, Brena announced the postponement of all her business obligations and concerts due to the COVID-19 pandemic.

Set list 
This setlist was obtained from the concert of October 20, 2018 held at Štark Arena in Belgrade. It does not represent all shows throughout the tour.

 "Boliš i ne prolaziš"
 "Srećna žena"
 "Kao nova"
 "Tako si juče"
 "Bolje ne"
 "Sve smo mi krive" / "Kad jedno voli za oboje"
 "Uđi slobodno" / "Grad"
 "Beli biseru" / "Recite mu da ga volim"
 "Mače moje" / "Dva dana"
 "Sigurno" / "Sledeći"
 "Zar je važno da l' se peva ili pjeva"
 "Jugoslovenka"
 "Luda za tobom" / "Ti si moj greh" / "Robinja" / "Kuća laži"
 "Čik pogodi"
 "Šeik"
 "Carica" / "Udri, Mujo"
 "Zašto" 
 "Sve mi dobro ide osim ljubavi"
 "Imam pesmu da vam pevam"
 "Čačak, Čačak"
 "Duge noge"
 "Mile voli disko" / "Sitnije, Cile, sitnije" / "Dama iz Londona"
 "Bato, Bato" / "Miki, Mićo"
 "Janoš" 
 "Čuvala me mama" / "Momci na vidiku" / "Boli me uvo za sve"
 "Sanjam" 
 "Hajde da se volimo"
 "Pazi kome zavidiš"
 "Četiri godine" / "Golube" / "Evo, zima će"
 "Jablane" / "A kako ću ja"
 "Ja nemam drugi dom"
 "Poželi sreću drugima"

Shows

Cancelled shows

Notes

References 

2017 concert tours
2018 concert tours
2019 concert tours
2020 concert tours
2021 concert tours
2022 concert tours
Lepa Brena concert tours
Concert tours of Europe